Abandoned is a 2010 American thriller film directed by Michael Feifer and starring Brittany Murphy, Dean Cain, Mimi Rogers and Jay Pickett. It is distributed by Anchor Bay Entertainment and one of two films released posthumously that starred Murphy.

Plot
Mary Walsh is a banker who is taking her boyfriend of four months Kevin Peterson to the hospital for a routine outpatient surgery. A nurse tells her the surgery will be exactly one hour. When she returns to take Kevin home, she discovers that he has mysteriously disappeared. An administrator can find no record of Kevin, and when Mary contacts the police, Detective Franklin arrives and initiates a search for Kevin but finds no evidence of Kevin having been at the facility.

Increasingly frantic, Mary is taken to staff psychiatrist Dr. Bensley, who deems her to be mentally unstable. She is then tasked to find her missing boyfriend and prove her sanity.

Mary is then approached by an anonymous older man claiming to know of Kevin's whereabouts. A ransom of 10 million dollars is demanded and Mary has one hour to comply or her boyfriend's life will be at risk. She has to embezzle from her bank. When she transfers the funds as directed she comes face to face with Kevin and realizes the truth.

It is revealed that Kevin is part of the gang who allegedly kidnapped him and that Mary has been trapped in an elaborate scheme aimed at stealing the 10 million dollars from her bank and with Mary being the only witness to the activity of the gang, they decide that they need to kill her.

Mary escapes from the one gang member who attempts to kill her and in doing so she kills him. Holloway's cell phone rings and she hears the others waiting on confirmation that Mary has been killed. Kevin realizes that Mary is still alive and orders the others to return and kill her. The gang attempt to run Mary down in their van, but she manages to escape through a doorway prompting two of the gang to chase her while Amanda stays behind. Mary kills Cooper and continues to evade the other.

Detective Franklin, chasing a lead, uncovers the plot and races back to the hospital. When he arrives he manages to apprehend one of the criminals. He also steps in to save Mary's life by shooting an armed Kevin. Kevin then falls to his death.

Cast
 Brittany Murphy as Mary Walsh
 Dean Cain as Kevin Peterson
 Mimi Rogers as Victoria Markham
 Peter Bogdanovich as Dr. Bensley
 Jay Pickett as Detective Franklin
 Tim Thomerson as Cooper
 Scott Anthony Leet as John Holloway
 America Young as Amanda
 Tara Subkoff as Nurse Anna
 Wood Dickinson as Business Man at Bank
 Hamit DAYLAK as wr00t

Production
Abandoned was shot in June 2009 and was Murphy's last filmed project before her death on December 20, 2009. It is one of two films released after her death (the other being 2014's Something Wicked). The film is dedicated to her.

Release
Anchor Bay Entertainment acquired distribution rights in North America and released the film direct-to-video on August 24, 2010.

References

External links

2010s English-language films
American psychological thriller films
2010 psychological thriller films
2010 films
Films directed by Michael Feifer
Films produced by Wood Dickinson
2010s American films